Murder Among Friends may refer to:
 Murder Among Friends (1982 film), a made for television British film
 Murder Among Friends (TV series), an American documentary television series
 Murder Among Friends (1941 film), an American mystery film